Hovaesia is a genus of moths in the family Sesiidae containing only one species, Hovaesia donckieri, which is known from Madagascar.

References

Sesiidae
Moths of Madagascar
Moths of Africa